The Interstate 74 Bridge, officially known as the Iowa-Illinois Memorial Bridge, and often called The Twin Bridges, or the I-74 Bridge, are basket-handle, through arch twin bridges that carry Interstate 74 across the Mississippi River and connect Bettendorf, Iowa and Moline, Illinois. It is located near the geographic center of the Quad Cities.

Original bridge

Before the first span was built, the only bridge in the Tri Cities was the Government Bridge between Rock Island, Illinois and Davenport, Iowa. William P. Bettendorf, founder of the Bettendorf Company and namesake for the city of Bettendorf, began planning a toll bridge between Bettendorf and Moline in 1907. The year before, the United States Congress passed a law allowing private citizens to build a bridge as a business venture. Bettendorf died in 1910 and the momentum to build the bridge died with him.

In 1931, the city of Davenport along with a group of local businessmen formed the Davenport Bridge Commission to construct the new bridge. Moline refused to grant the franchise for the bridge and the early years of the Great Depression made it difficult for the businessmen to finance it on their own without the city's help. After several setbacks because of design and location issues, construction for the first span began in 1934. It was designed by engineer Ralph Modjeski. The first span opened on November 18, 1935, as a toll bridge. Tolls were set at 15 cents for passenger vehicles and light trucks, 30 cents for heavy trucks, and 5 cents for pedestrians to use the sidewalk. In 1961, an identical twin span, built from the same blueprint, opened to facilitate increased traffic demands. Money from tolls paid for most of the new span. The upstream span was the older of the two. Tolls were discontinued in 1970. The twin spans were merged with Interstate 74 in 1975.

Built for a daily crossing of 48,000 vehicles, the daily average grew to 80,000, making it by far the most traveled bridge in the Quad Cities. In 1994, the Illinois Department of Transportation had requested a study of bridges from Interstate 80 to Interstate 280 in the Quad Cities and the Bi-State Regional Commission agreed. The other two Interstate bridges were up to Interstate standards, while the Interstate 74 Bridge was functionally obsolete and was not built to Interstate standards. Each span had two narrow lanes, no shoulder, and a  speed limit.

While on a tour at the base of the bridge in Bettendorf in May 2012, U.S. Transportation Secretary Ray LaHood said that, in comparison with other bridges that he has seen in other states, the I-74 Bridge is one of the worst he's seen.

New bridge

The I-74 Corridor Study was completed to study replacing the old bridge with a larger one with 4 lanes in each direction. The study claimed that the I-74 Bridge project would spur economic growth, create construction jobs, reduce traffic backups, and improve air quality.

Funding for the construction of the new bridge had been earmarked for $22 million in 2017 and $50 million in 2018. Former Illinois Governor Pat Quinn said the state is committed to bridge improvements to help traffic flow and "boost economic growth in the region".

By 2012, the Illinois Department of Transportation budgeted more than $34 million for engineering, design, and land acquisition for the new bridge. The conceptual design of the arch bridge was completed by CH2M Hill and Boston-based bridge designer Miguel Rosales from Rosales + Partners. Final design was completed by Modjeski and Masters in association with Alfred Benesch & Company. The portion of the bridge spanning the Mississippi River was estimated at more than $700 million, while the project as a whole, including all approach routes and connectors, was estimated at $1.2 billion.

The new bridge is just upstream from the old bridge and is a basket-handle, true-arch twin bridge with four lanes in each direction and a pedestrian/bicycle path. A ground-breaking ceremony for the new bridge was held on June 26, 2017. The westbound bridge was expected to be completed in late 2019 and the eastbound span was expected to be completed in late 2020. Winter weather conditions and the resulting high water over an extended period of time, however, created delays and the opening of the first span was pushed to the first half of 2020.

On November 13, 2020, the Iowa-bound side of the new bridge opened to motorists. The bridge was officially dedicated on December 1, 2021. Speakers included Congresswoman Cheri Bustos, Illinois Governor J. B. Pritzker and other state and local officials from both Illinois and Iowa. The second span for Illinois-bound traffic was opened the following evening. The pedestrian and bike path was opened on April 27, 2022. An elevator up to the walkway in Bettendorf has yet to be completed.

The contract for demolishing the old spans was awarded in 2022 to the Helm Group, who had a part in constructing the new viaducts in downtown Bettendorf. Because it will be taken down piece-by-piece, demolition of the old bridge is not expected to be completed until 2024. In December 2022 the United States Postal Service announced that an image of the new I-74 bridge would be one of four bridge stamps released in 2023.

See also
 
 
 
 
 List of crossings of the Upper Mississippi River

References

External links

I-74 Corridor Study

Suspension bridges in Iowa
Suspension bridges in Illinois
Bridges over the Mississippi River
Road bridges in Illinois
Buildings and structures in Moline, Illinois
Bettendorf, Iowa
74, Bridge
Bridges completed in 2020
Bridges completed in 2021
Interstate 74
Bridges on the Interstate Highway System
Tourist attractions in the Quad Cities
Bridges in Rock Island County, Illinois
Bridges in Scott County, Iowa
Bridges in the Quad Cities
Road bridges in Iowa
Bridges of the United States Numbered Highway System
Former toll bridges in Illinois
Former toll bridges in Iowa
1935 establishments in Illinois
1935 establishments in Iowa
Interstate vehicle bridges in the United States